Abderrazak Khairi (born 20 November 1962) is a Moroccan former football player and coach who played as a midfielder.

Career
Born in Rabat, Khairi played for the local club FAR Rabat. He scored goals in the 1985 and 1986 Coupe du Trône finals, helping the club win three successive cup finals.

He also played for the Morocco national team, scoring two goals for Morocco in the famous 1986 FIFA World Cup win against Portugal.

Khairi was appointed manager of MAS Fez in January 2006.

References

External links
 
 
 

1962 births
Living people
Footballers from Rabat
Moroccan footballers
Association football midfielders
Morocco international footballers
1986 FIFA World Cup players
1986 African Cup of Nations players
1988 African Cup of Nations players
Botola players
AS FAR (football) players
Moroccan football managers
AS FAR (football) managers
Maghreb de Fès managers
ittihad Tanger managers
KAC Kénitra managers